David Henry Scharer (born 1942), is a male former athlete who competed for England.

Athletics career
He represented England in the 400 metres hurdles, at the 1970 British Commonwealth Games in Edinburgh, Scotland.

He also competed in the 1971 European Athletics Championships in Helsinki.

References

1942 births
English male hurdlers
Athletes (track and field) at the 1970 British Commonwealth Games
Living people
Commonwealth Games competitors for England